Praemallaspis is a genus of beetles in the family Cerambycidae, containing the following species:

 Praemallaspis argodi (Lameere, 1909)
 Praemallaspis batesi (Lameere, 1909)
 Praemallaspis inca Galileo & Martins, 1992
 Praemallaspis leucaspis (Guérin-Méneville, 1844)
 Praemallaspis rhombodera (Bates, 1879)
 Praemallaspis xanthaspis (Guérin-Méneville, 1844)

References

Prioninae